

Werner Richter (21 October 1893 – 3 June 1944) was a German general during World War II. He was a recipient of the Knight's Cross of the Iron Cross. 

Werner Richter was wounded on 21 May 1944 and died in Riga on 3 June 1944.

Awards and decorations

 Knight's Cross of the Iron Cross on 7 February 1944 as Generalleutnant and commander of 263rd Infantry Division

References

Citations

Bibliography

 

1893 births
1944 deaths
People from Zittau
People from the Kingdom of Saxony
Lieutenant generals of the German Army (Wehrmacht)
German Army personnel of World War I
Recipients of the clasp to the Iron Cross, 1st class
Recipients of the Gold German Cross
Recipients of the Knight's Cross of the Iron Cross
German Army personnel killed in World War II
Military personnel from Saxony
German Army generals of World War II